20 Inolvidables (Eng.: 20 Unforgettables) is a compilation album released by Fonovisa for the Mexican groups Los Bukis and Los Temerarios. It was the second No. 1 album for Los Bukis and the fourth for Los Temerarios on the Billboard Top Latin Albums chart.

Track listing
All tracks performed by Los Bukis were written by Marco Antonio Solís and the tracks performed by Los Temerarios by Adolfo Angel Alba, unless otherwise noted.

Chart performance

References

Los Bukis compilation albums
Los Temerarios compilation albums
2003 compilation albums
Spanish-language compilation albums
Split albums
Fonovisa Records compilation albums